St. Mary of the Assumption Church (commonly referred to as St. Mary's) is a parish of the Roman Catholic Church in Dedham, Massachusetts, in the Archdiocese of Boston.

The first church was constructed in Dedham Centre in 1857 and it was formally established as a parish in 1866. In 1880 the parish built a larger church on High Street, towards East Dedham. The laying of the cornerstone for this "cathedral in the wilderness" attracted more than 4,000 people, and special trains were run from Boston and Norwood. The new church would not be completed until 1900, and was dedicated by Archbishop Sebastiano Martinelli, the papal delegate. Today the church hosts one of the largest Life Teen programs in the country.

History

Early history
The history of Catholicism in Dedham begins in 1758, only 120 years after the settlement of the Contentment Plantation and fully two decades before the American Revolution. During the French and Indian War the British expelled over 11,000 Acadians from what is today Nova Scotia.  Eleven of them resettled in Dedham, and though the town and the Massachusetts Bay colony were both officially Congregationalist, they were allowed to reside here as French neutrals until they returned to Canada in 1760.

After the Acadians returned to Canada in 1760, Dedham would not see another Catholic resident for decades. The first Catholic who spent any length of time in Dedham was Mr. Gill, who lived in what is today known as Riverdale, but was then called Dedham Island. The few Catholics who lived in Dedham would have to travel 16 miles to St. Joseph's in Roxbury, the Cathedral of the Holy Cross on Franklin Street in Boston, or to St. Mary's in Waltham to attend Mass.

By the early 1800s a few Catholics had settled in Dedham. The first Mass in Dedham was celebrated in Sunday, May 15, 1843, in the home of Daniel Slattery, with eight Catholics present. An altar was set up by the window. For the next three years Slattery's 17-year-old brother-in-law would bring Father James Strain from Waltham and back each Sunday to minister to the needs of the small congregation.

By 1846, the Catholic community in Dedham was well established enough that the town became part of the mission of St. Joseph's Church in Roxbury. The flood of Irish immigrants escaping the Great Famine necessitated holding Mass in the Temperance Hall, often by Father Patrick O'Beirne. Mass was also occasionally celebrated in the Crystal Palace on Washington Street. Worshipers came from Dedham, South Dedham, West Dedham, and West Roxbury.

First Church

The number and devotion of the first parishioners permitted a church to be constructed within 10 years. In 1856 the cornerstone was laid and, in 1857, the first St. Mary's Church was completed on Washington Street between Spruce and Marion Streets. On Easter Sunday, April 12, 1857, Father O'Beirne said Mass for the first time in a new church that could seat 600.

During the 1880s, Father Johnson was publicly raising the issue of discrimination against Catholics in the public schools. In 1885, as a member of the School Committee, he claimed the principal of the Avery School ridiculed Catholic students, and several years later had a lengthy debate with a Protestant minister via letters in the Dedham Standard about the "rank misrepresentation of the Catholic Church" in a history book adopted by the School Committee.

In 1890 there were an estimated 2,000 parishioners, including 957 Irish, 250 English-speaking Canadians, 58 French, 19 Italians and 1 Portuguese. There were 400 students in the Sunday School classes in 1884.

Church construction
In February 1880, it was announced that a Protestant who had business in Boston had paid off the parish's $700 debt, allowing the congregation to commence work on a new building. The cornerstone of the present church was laid at 3:00 on October 17, 1880 by Archbishop John Williams. A crowd of between 4,000 and 5,000 people attended, and special trains were run from Boston and Norwood to accommodate all those who wished to attend. It was one of the largest gatherings in Dedham's history.

The footprint of the Gothic church, which Father Johnson said was to be a "cathedral in the wilderness," measures 150' long by 65' wide, and the bell tower is 164' tall. The apex of the ceiling is 80' and it has the longest aisle in the Archdiocese of Boston. It was at the time, and remains today, "the largest and most imposing church in the town" and "one of the most conspicuous edifices" in the town.

The interior walls were plastered by William B. Gould, an escaped slave who settled in Dedham. While the upper church was still under construction, the lower church was used for Mass and the upper portion for various fairs and other gatherings. The first mass was said in the lower church on October 24, 1886. The crowd was overflowing, and included 20 Protestants, many of local importance, and a choir from St. Peter's in South Boston.

After 20 years of working, praying, and fundraising from the meager immigrant wages of many of the parishioners, the Upper Church was finally completed. It took so long that another architect had to take over but was, Father Fleming said, “almost too beautiful for ordinary use.”

The upper church was completed and dedicated by Archbishop Williams on September 9, 1900. In addition to Williams, Archbishop Sebastiano Martinelli, the papal delegate to the United States, attended, as did Bishop Denis Mary Bradley of New Hampshire. The crowd, numbered at 1,200, included the communion class and many prominent citizens of the Town, including Protestants. The dedication packed the church, requiring many to stand, and tickets were required to enter.

Albert Nickerson, a member of Dedham's St. Paul's Episcopal Church, donated $10,000 towards the effort. The Dedham Granite for the outer walls was donated by another Protestant, John Bullard. The granite came from Bullard's own lot.

20th century
In June 1890, Father John H. Fleming arrived at St. Mary's and began a 33-year tenure as pastor. During his pastorate the parish the upper church would be completed, the parish cemetery in West Roxbury would be purchased, and the old wooden rectory next to the church would be torn down so a new rectory could be built of Dedham Granite in 1913. On Sundays, however, the quality of his preaching was such that other priests would come to St. Mary's to listen.

In the 1920s, with the building work completed, new pastor Father Henry A. Walsh was able to focus on the various groups and societies within the parish. The Catholic population in the area grew, as did the amount of social activity within the parish. By 1936, the parish was one of the largest in the Archdiocese of Boston with 6,000 parishioners, four priests, and six nuns. The Sunday School alone had over 1,300 pupils. Within months of arriving as pastor in 1929, Father George P. O'Connor began a parish school with three Sisters of St. Joseph. He also began a Catholic Youth Organization, and was generally regarded as having a focus on youth.

Modern history
In the 1960s, St. Mary's remained one of the largest parishes in the archdiocese. As it was too much work for one pastor and three assistant priests, a second parish was established for the Riverdale neighborhood, St. Susana's, in 1962. As the school was also growing, a new convent was constructed in 1964.

The number of people attending Mass each week began to drop off rather dramatically in the early 1990s. In 1989, the average weekly attendance was 2,843 people. By 1995, however, it dropped to just 1,030. The following year, 1996, Father (later bishop) John Anthony Dooher and Father Chris Hickey arrived at St. Mary's within weeks of each other. Mass attendance increased by 50% that year alone, and in 1997 it was over 2,500. In September 1997, Hickey and youth minister Seán Flynn began a Life Teen program to minister to high school students.

Parish

In 2006, the parish served 2,329 families, and in 2015 it sponsored 38 ministries in six categories: prayer, liturgical, social, outreach, health and wellness, and parishioner sponsored.

Life Teen
One of the largest ministries in St. Mary's today in its Life Teen program, which ministers to high school aged youth. It was founded in September 1997 by Fr. Chris Hickey, then-pastor John Dooher, and youth minister Seán Flynn.

The teens' "enthusiasm for church has brought a special vibrancy" to the parish. A Life Teen mass is offered on Sunday evenings and features a live band, and is then followed by social and catechitical sessions known as Life Nights. Participants have their own prayer night, perform community service, and gather to socialize in their clubhouse.

Convent and parish office
Behind the church on Avery Street is the Parish Office. It was previously a convent that housed the nuns who taught in the parish school. The stained glass windows in the building were done by Chartrand.

Cemetery
In 1880, the Town of Dedham set aside a portion of Brookdale Cemetery, just a block away from St. Mary's, for Catholics to be buried. Under the pastorate of Fr. John H. Fleming (1890-1923), the parish purchased its own cemetery just over the border in West Roxbury. It still operates the cemetery on Grove Street today.

150th anniversary
In 2016 the parish celebrated its 150th anniversary with a year long celebration. Included in this was a mass on October 2 celebrated by Cardinal Seán Patrick O'Malley. Other events included a healing mass and an organ concert.

Vocations
Two LifeTeen alumni, Will Sexton and Mike Zimmerman, were ordained priests. Sexton and Zimmerman were both teens in the program, and were ordained alongside Kevin Leaver, who was a CORE member. Together the three made up 50% of those being ordained at the Cathedral of the Holy Cross in 2017. As of 2017, two other alumni and one former CORE member are seminarians for the Archdiocese of Boston, and one alumnus joined the Carmelites. From 2003 to 2018, the parish sent 15 men to the seminary.

Notes and citations

Notes

References

Works cited

External links

St. Mary's LifeTeen

Acadian diaspora
French-Canadian culture in Massachusetts
History of Dedham, Massachusetts
Roman Catholic churches in Massachusetts
Roman Catholic parishes of Archdiocese of Boston
Religious organizations established in 1866
1866 establishments in Massachusetts
Roman Catholic churches completed in 1900
Churches in Dedham, Massachusetts
Stone churches in Massachusetts
20th-century Roman Catholic church buildings in the United States